The Movement of Free Citizens (PSG) is a liberal political organization in Serbia.

History 
Saša Janković was in the position of state ombudsman, and as such, he often criticized practices of the government, led by SNS and Vučić. This positioned him among voters as opposition spokesperson and led to him enjoying relatively high ratings in relation to actual opposition leaders and politicians. As his term was about to end, he decided to resign and run in the presidential elections, scheduled for April 2017. His most notable endorsement came from the Democratic Party, which decided to support Janković, rather than to have a candidate of its own. This helped him create a relatively united front against Vučić in the upcoming elections.

In the aftermath of the elections, Janković, who finished second with 16.3% of the vote, decided to form his own political movement, rather than joining the Democratic Party. His movement "Apel 100", formed for the purposes of gathering support from intellectuals and other notable citizens for his presidential candidacy, was thereby transformed into a political organization, the Movement of Free Citizens.

Some of the founders of the Movement are Goran Marković, Zdravko Šotra, Nikola Đuričko, Sergej Trifunović, Srbijanka Turajlić, Borka Pavićević and Vlado Georgiev. Many of the founding members have left the Movement, accusing Janković of running it like his own 'company', and revealed that Janković's wife exerts enormous influence on how the Movement is run. Following the accusations, the Movement's Presidency held an emergency meeting, where Janković offered his resignation, a motion denied by the Presidency. This turmoil within the Movement led political analysts and other opposition leaders and politicians to question the capacity of Janković and the Movement to lead the opposition against Vučić's government.

On 17 December Janković resigned. Candidates for the new president were actor Sergej Trifunović and lawyer Aleksandar Olenik. Elections were held on 26 January 2019, and Trifunović won with 60% of the votes. Olenik and most of other high officials left the movement and announced creation of new party, Civic Democratic Forum.

Trifunović supported protests against Vučić. Movement signed Agreement with people along with other opposition parties on 6 February. After nine months of protests and the unsuccessful conclusion of the negotiation mediated by the University of Belgrade Faculty of Political Sciences and NGOs, on August 2019, Trifunović wrote an open letter to David McAllister, the Chairman of the Foreign Affairs Committee of the European Parliament, asking him to consider facilitating a cross-party dialogue. The first round of inter-party European Parliament-mediated dialogue in Serbia took place two months later.

Political positions 
It is a liberal political organization, and it encompasses both social liberalism, and economic liberalism. It is also supportive of accession of Serbia to the European Union. It is a member of the Liberal South East European Network and the Alliance of Liberals and Democrats for Europe.

Presidents of the Movement of Free Citizens

Acting presidents

Electoral performance

Parliamentary elections

Presidential elections

Provincial elections

Belgrade City Assembly election

See also 

 List of political parties in Serbia

References

2017 establishments in Serbia
Liberal parties in Serbia
Political parties established in 2017
Pro-European political parties in Serbia
Centrist parties in Serbia
Social liberal parties
Centre-left parties in Europe